Richard Franklin Bass is an American mathematician, the Board of Trustees Distinguished Professor Emeritus of Mathematics at the University of Connecticut. He is known for his work in probability theory.

Bass earned his Ph.D. from the University of California, Berkeley in 1977 under the supervision of Pressley Millar. He taught at the University of Washington before moving to Connecticut.

Bass is a fellow of the Institute of Mathematical Statistics. In 2012 he became a fellow of the American Mathematical Society.

Books
Bass is the author of:
Probabilistic Techniques in Analysis (Springer, 1995)
Diffusions and Elliptic Operators (Springer, 1997)
Stochastic Processes (Cambridge University Press, 2011)

References

External links
Home page

Year of birth missing (living people)
Living people
American mathematicians
Probability theorists
University of California, Berkeley alumni
University of Washington faculty
University of Connecticut faculty
Fellows of the American Mathematical Society